Fisherman's Memorial may refer to:

 Fishermen's Memorial State Park, Rhode Island, United States
 Gloucester Fisherman's Memorial, Gloucester, Massachusetts, United States
 Seattle Fishermen's Memorial, Seattle, Washington, United States
 Steveston Fisherman's Memorial, Steveston, British Columbia